Pleasant Valley Township is a township in Saline County, Kansas, in the United States.

Pleasant Valley Township was organized in 1873.

References

Townships in Saline County, Kansas
Townships in Kansas